Sir Roger Townshend (1477 – 10 May 1552) was an English landowner, knight and politician.

Life 
He was born in Raynham, Norfolk, as the son of Sir Roger Townshend and Eleanor Lumford of Raynham, and studied at Lincoln's Inn.

Instead of following in his father's footsteps as a judge, he devoted himself to his lands and to local affairs. He was appointed High Sheriff of Norfolk and Suffolk for 1511 and 1518 and elected Knight of the Shire for Norfolk in 1529 and 1542. He was knighted in 1518.

Family 
He had married Anne (or Amy) Brewes, daughter and co-heiress of William de Brewse, of Wenham Hall, Suffolk, and Stinton Hall in Norfolk, by whom he had six sons and two daughters:

Sir John Townshend (died 1543/4) of Raynham, who married Eleanor Heydon, the daughter of the courtier Sir John Heydon (died 1551) of Baconsthorpe Castle, Norfolk by his wife, Catherine Willoughby (died 1542), the daughter of Sir Christopher Willoughby. John Townshend predeceased his father, leaving five sons and two daughters, including an eldest son, Richard Townshend (died 1551), who married Katherine Browne, the daughter of Sir Humphrey Browne.
Sir Robert Townshend (died 3 February 1557), who was Justice of Chester, and married Alice Poppey, daughter and sole heir of Robert Poppey, esquire, of Brampton, Suffolk.
Sir George Townshend.
Sir Roger Townshend.
Sir Thomas Townshend of Tiverton.
Sir Giles Townshend (died 1552).
Susan Townshend, who married Sir Edmund Wyndham.
Katherine Townshend, who married Sir Henry Bedingfield.

He died on 10 May 1552 at Raynham. He was succeeded by his great-grandson, Sir Roger Townshend (died 1590), who served Thomas Howard, 4th Duke of Norfolk as his man of business.

Notes

Ancestry

References

 

History of Parliament TOWNSHEND, Sir Roger (by 1478–1551) of Raynham, Norf.

1477 births
1551 deaths
Roger
Members of Lincoln's Inn
Serjeants-at-law (England)
15th-century English people
High Sheriffs of Norfolk
High Sheriffs of Suffolk
English MPs 1529–1536
English MPs 1536
English MPs 1542–1544
16th-century English lawyers
People from Breckland District
People from Raynham, Norfolk
Members of Parliament for Norfolk